Johnstown is a townland in the Barony of Ormond Lower, County Tipperary, Ireland. It is located in the civil parish of Killodiernan.

Buildings of note
Two buildings within the townland are listed as protected structures by Tipperary County Council (RPS Ref S192 and S191).

Killodiernan Church of Ireland, built 1811 of rubble stone with a four pinnacle tower and white brick dressing around the windows and the Gateway of the former Johnstown house with three arches in the Neo-Classical style.

References

Townlands of County Tipperary